Xantheranthemum, known as the golden vein plant or bronze vein plant, is a genus of flowering plants in the family Acanthaceae. It has only one currently accepted species, Xantheranthemum igneum, native to Peru. It is grown as a greenhouse or house plant. There may be some confusion caused by the names of the botanists Linden and Lindau, as some sources associate it with Aphelandra goodspeedii Standl. & F.A.Barkley, along with Chamaeranthemum igneum Regel, Eranthemum igneum Linden, Stenandrium igneum (Linden) André, Stenandrium pictum N.E.Br., and Xantheranthemum igneum (Linden) Lindau.

References

Acanthaceae
Acanthaceae genera
Endemic flora of Peru
Monotypic Lamiales genera